I'm with Her may refer to:

 I'm with Her (band), an American band
 I'm with Her (TV series), an American TV series
 "I'm with her" (slogan), a campaign slogan from the 2016 Hillary Clinton presidential campaign
"I'm with Her", a 2016 song by Le Tigre
 "I'm with Her", a song by Rhett Miller from The Believer